ISO 9846, Solar energy -- Calibration of a pyranometer using a pyrheliometer, is the ISO standard for the calibration of a pyranometer using a pyrheliometer.

References 

Meteorological instrumentation and equipment
09846
Radiometry